Martin King (born 7 April 1963) is an Irish broadcaster who was the Monday to Thursday co-host of The Six O'Clock Show on Virgin Media One (formerly TV3) and presents his own radio show on Saturday Mid Morning on Q102. King was TV3's first ever weather anchor when it launched back in 1998.

Career
King got involved in radio when he was 15 years old working for pirate radio stations including Big D and Sunshine 101. He joined 98FM when it launched in 1989 where he was one of their main on-air personalities before becoming TV3's weather anchor when it launched on 20 September 1998. King also had his own Saturday morning show on Today FM from 2002 until 2017.

King's personality-driven style of weather forecasting on TV3 won King many awards and he was one of the main features of TV3's news presentation. He appeared as a guest on The Podge and Rodge Show on RTÉ Two in March 2006. As well as presenting weather bulletins, King has also presented a number of shows with TV3 such as Martin King's Commercial Breakdown in 2008 and along with Sybil Mulcahy, co-hosted The Morning Show with Sybil & Martin which ran from 2009 until it was axed in 2013.

King went on to co-host its replacement show called Late Lunch Live that was also co-hosted by Lucy Kennedy and Claire Solan. After TV3 lost the right to Emmerdale and Coronation Street to UTV Ireland in 2015, King became the Monday to Thursday co-host of The Seven O'Clock Show which air in the slot where Emmerdale and Coronation Street aired. When TV3 got the rights to air Emmerdale and Coronation Street again in 2016 after buying UTV Ireland, the show moved and became The Six O'Clock Show where King was the Monday to Thursday co-host. Since 2017, King has presented a daily Monday to Friday show on Q102. In November 2022 King left the Six O'Clock Show and joined Ireland AM on the weekends.

Personal life
King lives in Rathfarnham in South Co.Dublin with photographer Jenny McCarthy and their children. They met when King was an 98FM presenter and McCarthy was one of the "Thunder Girls". They married in Killashee House Hotel in Naas, County Kildare, on 7 November 2011 and honeymooned in the Canaries.

King is a keen sports fan, especially GAA and soccer. He supports Bohemians.

References

External links
 The Six O'Clock Show
 Martin King on Q102

1963 births
Living people
Dublin's 98FM presenters
Irish radio presenters
Irish television presenters
People from Raheny
Dublin's Q102 presenters
Today FM presenters
Virgin Media Television (Ireland) presenters
Weather presenters